

The PIK-11 Tumppu ("Mitten") was a single-seat, single-engine sport aircraft developed in Finland in the 1950s. It was a low-wing, cantilever monoplane of conventional design with an enclosed cockpit and fixed, tailwheel undercarriage. It was to be the first powered aircraft produced by Polyteknikkojen Ilmailukerho, with the objective being building an aircraft for club use that was cheap to build and easy to fly.

Design work was started in 1948 by Kai Mellen and Ilkka Lounanmaa under the direction of Professor Arvo Ylinen. The first of four machines made its first flight on 15 March 1953. The prototype is preserved at the Finnish Aviation Museum, and another example was still listed on the Finnish Civil Aviation Authority registry in 2008.

In the early 21st century, a flying replica was under construction, to be powered by a Rotax 912 engine.

Specifications

Notes

References

 
 
 
 
 
 

1950s Finnish sport aircraft
PIK aircraft
Single-engined tractor aircraft
Low-wing aircraft
Aircraft first flown in 1953